IB3  is a publicly funded Balearic television channel.

IB3 began test transmissions on 1 March 2005—the holiday known as "Balearic Islands Day"—with the first regular broadcast beginning on 5 September 2005.

It is owned by the Ens Públic de Radiotelevisió de les Illes Balears and Federación de Organismos de Radio y Televisión Autonómicos (FORTA). The studios are located in Calvià, a municipality of the island of Majorca, near Palma.

Initially, the channel's transmissions were in Catalan (informative and children's programming) and Castilian (films, series and documentaries). Currently, the channel airs all its shows in Catalan only.

References

External links
IB3

Television stations in Spain
Television stations in the Balearic Islands
Mass media in Calvià
FORTA
Television channels and stations established in 2005